This is a list of noteworthy guests that have been on The Daily Show with Jon Stewart.
As of his appearance on August 15, 2012, Brian Williams has made 15 appearances as an interview guest. Prior to Williams, the most frequently appearing guest on the program was Sen. John McCain with 13 visits.  McCain was introduced by Jon Stewart as the "most frequently appearing guest" during McCain's appearance on 16 August 2007. As of 2015, the most frequent guest on the show is Fareed Zakaria, with 19 appearances and Comedian/Actor Denis Leary, with 16 appearances since Jon took over in 1999.

Politicians

Heads of state,  heads of government, deputy heads of state or their spouses

 Barack Obama, former President of the United States
 Joe Biden, former Vice President of the United States
 Jimmy Carter, former President of the United States
 Bill Clinton, former President of the United States
 Al Gore, former Vice President of the United States
 Hillary Clinton, former United States Secretary of State and wife of former U.S. President Bill Clinton
 Tony Blair, former Prime Minister of the United Kingdom
 Gordon Brown, former Prime Minister of the United Kingdom
 Vicente Fox, former President of Mexico
 Evo Morales, President of Bolivia
 Pervez Musharraf, former President of Pakistan
 Abdullah II, King of Jordan
 Ellen Johnson Sirleaf, President of Liberia
 Rosalynn Carter wife of former President of the United States Jimmy Carter
 Lynne Cheney, wife of former U.S. Vice President Dick Cheney
 Michelle Obama, wife of President of the United States Barack Obama
 Mohamed Nasheed, former President of the Maldives
 Nicola Sturgeon, current First Minister of Scotland

Members of the United States Cabinet

 Madeleine Albright, former United States Secretary of State
 Robert Gates, former United States Secretary of Defense
 John Ashcroft, former United States Attorney General
 James Baker, former United States Secretary of State
 Zbigniew Brzezinski, former United States National Security Advisor
 Steven Chu, United States Secretary of Energy
 Austan Goolsbee, former Chairman of the Council of Economic Advisers
 Lisa P. Jackson, Administrator of the Environmental Protection Agency
 Henry Kissinger, former United States Secretary of State
 Ray LaHood, United States Secretary of Transportation
 Gary Locke, United States Secretary of Commerce
 Ray Mabus, United States Secretary of the Navy
 Janet Napolitano, United States Secretary of Homeland Security
 Paul O'Neill, former United States Secretary of the Treasury
 Colin Powell, former United States Secretary of State
 Robert Reich, former United States Secretary of Labor
 Tom Ridge, former United States Secretary of Homeland Security
 Donald Rumsfeld, former United States Secretary of Defense
 Ken Salazar, United States Secretary of the Interior—First Obama cabinet member to be guest during time in office.
 Kathleen Sebelius, United States Secretary of Health and Human Services
 Margaret Spellings, United States Secretary of Education—The only Bush cabinet level guest to appear while holding office.
 Christine Todd Whitman, former Governor of New Jersey and Administrator of the Environmental Protection Agency

Members of the United States Senate

 Evan Bayh, (D) Indiana, former
 Joe Biden, (D) Delaware, former
 Barbara Boxer, (D) California
 Bill Bradley, (D) New Jersey, former
 Lincoln Chafee, (I) Rhode Island, former
 Hillary Clinton, (D) New York, former
 Norm Coleman, (R) Minnesota, former
 Tom Daschle, (D) South Dakota, former
 Chris Dodd, (D) Connecticut, former
 Bob Dole, (R) Kansas, former
 Dick Durbin, (D), Illinois
 John Edwards, (D) North Carolina, former
 Russell Feingold, (D) Wisconsin, former
 Al Franken, (D) Minnesota
 Gary Hart, (D) Colorado, former
 Kay Bailey Hutchison, (R) Texas, former
 Ted Kennedy, (D) Massachusetts, former
 Bob Kerrey, (D) Nebraska, former
 John Kerry, (D) Massachusetts, former
 Joseph Lieberman, (I) Connecticut, former
 Trent Lott, (R) Mississippi, former
 John McCain, (R) Arizona
 Bob Menendez, (D) New Jersey
 Zell Miller, (D) Georgia, former
 Carol Moseley-Braun, (D) Illinois, former
 Ben Nelson, (D) Nebraska, former
 Barack Obama, (D) Illinois, former
 Rand Paul, (R) Kentucky
 Bernie Sanders, (I) Vermont
 Rick Santorum, (R) Pennsylvania, former
 Charles Schumer, (D) New York
 Arlen Specter, (D), Pennsylvania, former

Members of the United States House of Representatives

 Henry Bonilla, (R)
 Barney Frank, (D), Chairman of the United States House Committee on Financial Services
 Dick Gephardt, (D)
 Newt Gingrich, (R) former Speaker
 Dennis Kucinich, (D)
 Ron Paul, (R)
 Nancy Pelosi, (D) Speaker

Other federal officers and advisers

 John R. Bolton, former United States Ambassador to the United Nations
 Michael D. Brown, former administrator of Federal Emergency Management Agency
 Andrew Card, former White House Chief of Staff
 Ari Fleischer, former White House Press Secretary
 Alan Greenspan, former chairman of the Federal Reserve
 Karen Hughes, former executive adviser to President George H. W. Bush
 Scott McClellan, former White House Press Secretary
 Dana Perino, former White House Press Secretary
 Richard Perle,  former Assistant United States Secretary of Defense
 Tony Snow, former White House Press Secretary
 George Tenet, former Director of Central Intelligence for the United States Central Intelligence Agency
 Ambassador Joseph C. Wilson
 Supreme Court Justice Sonia Sotomayor

Governors

 Evan Bayh, former Governor of Indiana
 Rod Blagojevich, former Governor of Illinois
 Jon Corzine, former Governor of New Jersey
 Mario Cuomo, former Governor of New York
 Mitch Daniels, Governor of Indiana
 Howard Dean, former Governor of Vermont and chairman of the Democratic National Committee
 Mike Huckabee, former Governor of Arkansas
 Tim Kaine, former Governor of Virginia, and chairman of the Democratic National Committee
 Bob Kerrey, former Governor of Nebraska
 James McGreevey, former Governor of New Jersey
 Tim Pawlenty, former Governor of Minnesota
 Rick Perry, former Governor of Texas
 Marc Racicot, former Governor of Montana and former chairman of the Republican National Committee
 Bill Richardson, former Governor of New Mexico
 William Weld, former Governor of Massachusetts

Mayors

 Bill de Blasio, Mayor of New York City
 Michael Bloomberg, former Mayor of New York City
 Rudy Giuliani, former Mayor of New York City
 Ed Koch, former Mayor of New York City
 Boris Johnson, Mayor of London
 Ray Nagin, former Mayor of New Orleans

Other political guests

Ali Allawi, former Minister of Defense of Iraq
 Donna Brazile, former campaign manager for Al Gore
 Pat Buchanan, political commentator, unsuccessful candidate for the Republican nomination for President, 1992 and 1996; unsuccessful Reform Party nominee for president in 2000
 Wesley Clark, retired U.S. Army general, unsuccessful candidate for the Democratic nomination for President in 2004
 Elizabeth Edwards, deceased wife of former North Carolina Senator John Edwards
 Ed Gillespie, former chairman of the Republican National Committee
 Bill Kristol, political commentator, founder/editor of The Weekly Standard
 Christine Lagarde, Managing Director of the International Monetary Fund
 Terry McAuliffe, former chairman of the Democratic National Committee
 Ken Mehlman, campaign manager for George W. Bush in 2004 and former chairman of the Republican National Committee
 Ralph Nader, consumer advocate, four-time unsuccessful Green and independent candidate for President
 Jenny Sanford, ex-wife of former South Carolina Governor Mark Sanford
 Rev. Al Sharpton, civil rights activist, unsuccessful candidate for the Democratic nomination for President in 2004
 Howard Stern, producer and radio talk show host
 Archbishop Desmond Tutu, South African anti-apartheid leader, human rights spokesman
 Bob Woodward and Carl Bernstein, Washington Post journalists who broke Watergate scandal; authors
 Howard Zinn, historian, political activists
 John Zogby, pollster, founder and president/CEO of Zogby International

Journalists
 Christiane Amanpour, ABC host of This Week
 Reza Aslan, Middle East Analyst for CBS News
 Maziar Bahari, Newsweek
 Fred Barnes, Fox News analyst
 Tom Brokaw, former NBC Nightly News anchor
 Rajiv Chandrasekaran, assistant managing editor of The Washington Post, author
 Anderson Cooper, CNN Correspondent and host of Anderson Cooper 360
 Bob Costas, NBC Sports commentator
 Katie Couric, CBS Evening News anchor
 Thomas Friedman, nationally syndicated columnist
 David Gregory, NBC
 Christopher Hitchens, columnist and author
 Peter Jennings, late ABC World News Tonight anchor
 Jim Kelly, managing editor of Time magazine
 Ted Koppel, former host of Nightline
 Larry King, former host of Larry King Live
 Matt Lauer, Co-anchor of NBC's The Today Show
 Lara Logan, CBS News war correspondent.
 Rachel Maddow, host of MSNBC's The Rachel Maddow Show
 Chris Matthews, host of MSNBC's Hardball with Chris Matthews
 Michael Moore, documentary filmmaker
 Bill Moyers, former host of PBS's Now
 Bill O'Reilly, host of The O'Reilly Factor on Fox News
 Jeremy Paxman, host of the BBC's Newsnight
 Dan Rather, former CBS Evening News anchor
 Al Roker, weatherman of NBC's Today Show
 Helen Thomas, White House Correspondent Mike Wallace, former host of 60 Minutes Barbara Walters, conductor of The View Brian Williams, former NBC Nightly News anchor
 Fareed Zakaria, former editor of Newsweek International Jorge Ramos, Noticiero Univision anchor

 Actors and actresses 
 Ben Affleck, actor and Academy Award-winning screenwriter
 Alan Alda
 Amy Adams
 Gillian Anderson
 Julie Andrews
 Rowan Atkinson
 Kate Beckinsale
 Halle Berry, Academy Award-winning actress
 David Boreanaz
 Adrien Brody, Academy Award-winning actor
 Pierce Brosnan
 Sandra Bullock, Academy Award-winning actress
 Steve Carell
 George Clooney, Academy Award-winning actor
 Sacha Baron Cohen, once as Borat and once out of character
 Daniel Craig, current James Bond
 David Cross
 Russell Crowe, Academy Award-winning actor
 Matt Damon, Academy Award-winning actor
 Claire Danes
 Cameron Diaz
 David Duchovny
 Clint Eastwood
 Carmen Electra
 Colin Farrell
 Colin Firth, Academy Award-winning actor
 Mick Foley, pro wrestler and writer
 Harrison Ford, Academy Award nominee
 Jodie Foster, two-time Academy Award-winning actress
 Jamie Foxx, Academy Award-winning actor
 Richard Gere
 Ricky Gervais
 Adam Goldberg
 Joseph Gordon-Levitt
 Topher Grace
 Seth Green
 Jake Gyllenhaal, Academy Award nominee
 Maggie Gyllenhaal, Academy Award nominee
 Anne Hathaway, Academy Award nominee
 Dustin Hoffman, two-time Academy Award-winning actor
 Ron Howard, actor and Academy Award-winning director
 Samuel L. Jackson, Academy Award nominee
 Angelina Jolie, Academy Award-winning actress
 Keira Knightley, Academy Award nominee
 Denis Leary, comedian
 Heath Ledger, Academy Award-winning actor
 Ashton Kutcher
 John Malkovich, Academy Award nominee
 Rachel McAdams
 Ian McKellen, Academy Award nominee
 Dennis Miller, comedian
 Clive Owen, Academy Award nominee
 Elliot Page, Academy Award nominee
 Robert Patrick
 Dev Patel
 Matthew Perry
 Natalie Portman, Academy Award-winning actress
 Dennis Quaid
 John C. Reilly, Academy Award nominee
 Christina Ricci
 Seth Rogen
 Paul Rudd
 Adam Sandler
 Jerry Seinfeld
 Ben Stiller
 Meryl Streep, three-time Academy Award-winning actress
 Christopher Walken, Academy Award-winning actor
 Bruce Willis
 Elijah Wood
 Jim Parsons

Musicians
 Tori Amos
 Arcade Fire
 Atoms for Peace, who performed "Default" and "Harrowdown Hill"
 Justin Bieber, who performed on the show
 Jon Bon Jovi
 Bono
 Coldplay, who performed songs from their 2008 album, Viva La Vida Jakob Dylan
 The Goo Goo Dolls
 Dave Grohl
 Jack's Mannequin, who performed songs from their 2008 album, The Glass Passenger Wynton Marsalis
 John Mellencamp
 Willie Nelson
 Pink, who performed on the show
 Questlove
 RZA
 Richie Sambora
 Slash
 Esperanza Spalding, who performed on the show
 Bruce Springsteen, who performed on the show
 Ringo Starr, who performed on the show with Ben Harper and Relentless7
 Tenacious D, who performed on the show
 They Might Be Giants, who also perform The Daily Show'' theme song, penned by Bob Mould
 Pete Townshend
 Tom Waits, who performed on the show
 The White Stripes, who performed on the show
 Neil Young

Athletes and sports figures
 Lance Armstrong
 Tiki Barber
 Charles Barkley
 Bob Bradley
 Tom Coughlin
 Landon Donovan
 Cuba Gooding, Jr.
 Phil Jackson
 LeBron James
 Derek Jeter
 Magic Johnson
 Willie Mays
 Reggie Miller
 Shaquille O'Neal
 Pelé
 Mike Piazza
 Jerry Rice
 Mariano Rivera
 Bill Russell
 Phil Simms
 Tim Tebow
 Mookie Wilson
 David Wright
 Matt Harvey

Businessmen
 Elon Musk, co-founder of Tesla Inc., SpaceX, Solar City, Neuralink, OpenAI, PayPal
 Jeff Bezos, founder of Amazon.com
 Richard Branson, Chairman of Virgin Group
 Bill Gates, Chairman of Microsoft
 Craig Newmark, founder of Craigslist
 Jimmy Wales, co-founder of Wikipedia

Writers
 Ian Bremmer
 Denis Leary
 David Sedaris
 Kurt Vonnegut
 Michael Wallis
 Howard Zinn
 John Green

See also
 List of The Daily Show episodes

References

External links
 Guest Appearances for The Daily Show at The Internet Movie Database
 A list of The Daily Show guests at ShunTV.net (from Jon Stewart's takeover to January 6, 2005)
 Upcoming guest list for The Daily Show at interbridge.com